The Vaison Diadumenos is a life size marble statue of an athlete found at the Roman city of Vaison, southern France. Since 1870, it has been part of the British Museum's collection.

Discovery
The statue known as the Vaison Diadumenos was discovered in the late nineteenth century in the Roman Theatre at Vaison-La-Romaine, department of Vaucluse, southern France. It was offered for sale to the Louvre, but the national museum refused to buy it on the grounds of the exorbitant price. It was later purchased by the British Museum in 1870, where it has remained ever since.

Description
The sculpture is one of a series of Roman statues found across the empire that were modelled on a lost original made in bronze by the sculptor Polykleitos in about 440 BC. The Diadumenos was the winner of an athletic tournament at a games, still nude after the contest and lifting his arms to knot a ribbon-band across his head. The Vaison statue is missing his left hand and ribbon but is otherwise in good condition. The statue would have been displayed in a prominent position in the theatre, proudly demonstrating the sophistication of the local Roman citizenry and their commitment to the ideals of Ancient Greece.

See also
Farnese Diadumenos, also in the British Museum

Gallery

References

Further reading
S. Walker, Greek and Roman Portraits (London, The British Museum Press, 1995)
S. Walker, Roman art (London, 1991)
L. Burn, The British Museum book of Greek and Roman Art, revised edition (London, The British Museum Press, 1999)

Ancient Greek and Roman sculptures in the British Museum
Roman copies of 5th-century BC Greek sculptures
2nd-century Roman sculptures
Archaeological discoveries in France